Malephora purpureocrocea is a species of plants in the family Aizoaceae (stone plants).

Sources

References 

Aizoaceae